was an old province of Japan in the area that is today the eastern part of Kagoshima Prefecture. It was sometimes called .  Ōsumi bordered on Hyūga and Satsuma Provinces.

Osumi's ancient capital was near modern Kokubu. During the Sengoku and Edo periods, Ōsumi was controlled by the Shimazu clan of neighboring Satsuma and did not develop a major administrative center.

The Ōsumi region has developed its own distinct local dialect.  Although Ōsumi is part of Kagoshima Prefecture today, this dialect is different from that spoken in the city of Kagoshima.  There is a notable cultural pride in traditional poetry written in Ōsumi and Kagoshima dialects.

Japan's first satellite, Ōsumi, was named after the province.

Historical record
In the 3rd month of the 6th year of the Wadō era (713), the land of Ōsumi Province was administratively separated from Hyūga Province.  In that same year, Empress Genmei's Daijō-kan continued to organize other cadastral changes in the provincial map of the Nara period.

Historical districts
 Kagoshima Prefecture
 Aira District (姶良郡) - absorbed Kuwabara and Nishisoo Districts on March 29, 1896
 Gomu District (馭謨郡) - merged into Kumage District on March 29, 1896
 Hishikari District (菱刈郡) - merged with Kitaisa District (北伊佐郡) of Satsuma Province to become the 2nd incarnation of Isa District (伊佐郡) on March 29, 1896
 Kimotsuki District (肝属郡) - absorbed Minamiōsumi District on March 29, 1896
 Kumage District (熊毛郡) - absorbed Gomu District on March 29, 1896
 Kuwabara District (桑原郡) - was merged into Aira District (along with Nishisoo District) on March 29, 1896
 Ōshima District (大島郡)
 Ōsumi District (大隅郡)
 Kitaōsumi District (北大隅郡) - merged into Kagoshima District (鹿児島郡) of Satsuma Province (along with Taniyama District (谿山郡) of Satsuma Province) on March 29, 1896
 Minamiōsumi District (南大隅郡) - merged into Kimotsuki District on March 29, 1896
 Soo District (囎唹郡)
 Higashisoo District (東囎唹郡) - merged with Minamimorokata District (南諸県郡) (formerly from Miyazaki Prefecture) to become the 2nd incarnation of Soo District (曽於郡; as of 1972) on March 29, 1896
 Nishisoo District (西囎唹郡) - was merged into Aira District (along with Kuwabura District) on March 29, 1896

Notes

References
 Nussbaum, Louis-Frédéric and Käthe Roth. (2005).  Japan encyclopedia. Cambridge: Harvard University Press. ;  OCLC 58053128
 Titsingh, Isaac. (1834).  Annales des empereurs du Japon (Nihon Ōdai Ichiran).  Paris: Royal Asiatic Society, Oriental Translation Fund of Great Britain and Ireland. OCLC 5850691.

Other websites

  Murdoch's map of provinces, 1903

Former provinces of Japan